Fraize is a commune in the Vosges department in Grand Est in northeastern France about 25 miles from Colmar.

Twin communes
Since 1998 Fierza, Albania is a twin commune of Fraize.

See also
Communes of the Vosges department

References

External links

Town website  

Communes of Vosges (department)